USS Annapolis may refer to:

 , a gunboat commissioned in 1897 and in periodic service until 1919, then used as a training ship until 1940
 , ex- escort carrier renamed Annapolis (AGMR-1) in 1963
 , a  commissioned in 1992

United States Navy ship names